William George Grace (8 July 1876 – 23 June 1938) was an Australian rules footballer who played with Essendon in the Victorian Football League (VFL).

Family
The son of Thomas Grace, and Julia Grace, née O'Callaghan, William George Grace was born in Richmond, Victoria on 8 July 1876. He was the younger brother of Fitzroy footballers Jim Grace and Mick Grace.

Grace married Ethel Violet Moore in 1906 and he died at his home, in Essendon, Victoria on 23 June 1938.

Footnotes

References

External links 

1876 births
1938 deaths
Australian rules footballers from Victoria (Australia)
Essendon Football Club players